Mangetti National Park is a national park located in northern Namibia.

It is situated in the eastern Kalahari woodlands about 100 km south-west of Rundu. 

The park is being managed for the goal of increasing tourism in the region to reduce poverty in Namibia. Mangetti is part of a new generation of parks aimed at reducing rural poverty through tourism development, joint management and benefit sharing with local communities. It is one of Namibia's latest national parks and has the potential to become a new tourism highlight  in the north east, while protecting wildlife and vegetation. It also has the potential to provide tangible socio-economic benefits to local communities through careful tourism development.

History 
The area was previously used for breeding rare and endangered animals.

See also
 List of national parks of Namibia

References

National parks of Namibia
2008 establishments in Namibia